Senator Boswell may refer to:

David Boswell (Kentucky politician) (born 1949), Kentucky State Senate
Leonard Boswell (1934–2018), Iowa State Senate